John Gunawan (born 17 October 1925) was an Indonesian sailor. He competed in the Flying Dutchman event at the 1968 Summer Olympics.

References

External links
 

1925 births
Possibly living people
Indonesian male sailors (sport)
Olympic sailors of Indonesia
Sailors at the 1968 Summer Olympics – Flying Dutchman
People from Sukabumi
Asian Games medalists in sailing
Sailors at the 1970 Asian Games
Medalists at the 1970 Asian Games
Asian Games bronze medalists for Indonesia
20th-century Indonesian people